Yoseph Macwan (born 20 December 1940 – 25 December 2022) was a Gujarati poet and critic from Gujarat, India. He was also well known for his contribution in Gujarati children's literature.

Biography
He was born on 20 December 1940 at Ahmedabad to Philip and Mariyam. His family belonged to Malawada village near Nadiad. Due to family constraints, he worked as a helper in Ahmedabad Municipal Transport Service after SSC but he was underpaid thus he decided to continue studies. He completed B. A. in Gujarati  in 1968, M. A. in 1970 and B. Ed. in 1975 from Gujarat University. He regularly attended Budh Sabha. He joined Sheth Chimanlal Nagindas Vidyalaya, Ahmedabad as a teacher in 1963 and served there until his retirement. He ran Vaishakhi bimonthly for three years.

Macwan died on 25 December 2022 in Ahmedabad.

Works
His first work Aravata was published in Sanskriti magazine. Swagat (1969) was his first poetry collection which included sonnets, metrical poetry and geet. His other poetry collections are Soorajno Hath (1983), Alakhna Asawar (1994) and Avajna X-Ray (2000).

He has contributed in Gujarati children's literature. His children's poetry collections are Tofan (1999), Ding Dong-Ding Dong (1998) while children's stories include Vah Re Varta Vah! (1994). His birds related poetry includes Pranibagni Ser and Kalrav (1990).

Kan Hoy Te Sambhale (2001) and Samvedanna Sal Ane Val (2004) are his essay collections. Halva Hathe (1997) has humorous essays. He wrote criticism also which is published in Cross Ane Kavi (1987), Shabdagoshthi, Shabdani Arpar (2008), Shabdane Ajvale (2007) and Shabdasahvas (2008). Stotrasamhita (1980) is his metrical translation of the Biblical alleluias which are sung in several churches of Gujarat.

Awards
His first poetry collection Swagat was awarded by Government of Gujarat. His children's poetry was awarded by Gujarati Sahitya Akademi while his children's stories were awarded by Gujarati Sahitya Parishad. He received Jayant Pathak Poetry Award for Soorajno Hath in 1983. He received Kumar Suvarna Chandrak in 2013.

Personal life
He married twice; 1960-67 and in 1973 to Sabina aka Surbhi. They had two children.

References

External links
 

1940 births
2022 deaths
Gujarati-language writers
Writers from Ahmedabad
20th-century Indian poets
Children's poets
Gujarati-language poets
Indian children's writers
20th-century Indian essayists
Indian literary critics
Gujarat University alumni